Obrigado Saudade (Portuguese for "thank you saudade") is the fifth studio album by American band Mice Parade. It was released on January 27, 2004, by Bubblecore Records. Kristín Anna Valtýsdóttir, a former member of the Icelandic band Múm, makes an appearance in "Two, Three, Fall" and "Spain".

Critical reception

At Metacritic, which assigns a normalized rating out of 100 to reviews from mainstream critics, the album has an average score of 75 based on 13 reviews, indicating "generally favorable reviews".

Track listing

References

2004 albums
Mice Parade albums